The Harpidae, known as the harp snails, are the members of a taxonomic family of large predatory sea snails, marine gastropod mollusks.

Subfamilies and genera 
This family consists of the following subfamilies (according to the taxonomy of the Gastropoda by Bouchet & Rocroi, 2005):
 Harpinae Bronn, 1849
 † Cryptochordinae Korobkov, 1955
 Moruminae Hughes & Emerson, 1987

Genera in the family Harpidae include:
Harpinae
Austroharpa Finlay, 1931
 † Eocithara P. Fischer, 1883
Harpa Röding, 1798 - type genus of the family Harpidae
 Harpalis Link, 1807: synonym of Harpa Röding, 1798
 Palamharpa Iredale, 1931: synonym of Austroharpa Finlay, 1931

† Cryptochordinae
 † Cryptochorda Mörch, 1858 - type genus of the subfamily Cryptochordinae

 Moruminae
Morum Röding, 1798 - type genus of the subfamily Moruminae
 Cancellomorum Emerson & Old, 1963: synonym of Morum Röding, 1798
 Herculea H. Adams & A. Adams, 1858: synonym of Morum (Herculea) H. Adams & A. Adams, 1858 represented as Morum Röding, 1798
 Lambidium Link, 1807: synonym of Morum Röding, 1798
 Onimusiro Kuroda, Habe & Oyama, 1971: synonym of Morum Röding, 1798
 Oniscia G. B. Sowerby I, 1825: synonym of Morum Röding, 1798
 Oniscidia Mörch, 1852: synonym of Morum (Oniscidia) Mörch, 1852 represented as Morum Röding, 1798
 Pulchroniscia Garrard, 1961: synonym of Morum (Oniscidia) Mörch, 1852 represented as Morum Röding, 1798

References

 
Gastropod families
Taxa named by Heinrich Georg Bronn